This is a list of indigenous people who have won or been nominated for Academy Awards.

Best Picture

Best Actress

Best Supporting Actor

Best Supporting Actress

Best Adapted Screenplay

Best Original Song

Best Short Film, Live Action

Best Foreign Language Film

Honorary Award

References

Lists of Academy Award winners by ethnicity